Nicolás Francisco Larrondo Ossandón (born October 4, 1987) is a Chilean former footballer who played as a centre-back.

Club career
He primarily played centre-back defender and wore the number three.  He made his professional debut during the 2006 Clausura. In 2009, he was part of the squad that won the Apertura championship.

Struggling with knee injuries since 2008, and after becoming a free agent and not receiving any offer, he retired from football in 2015 at the age of just 26.

International career
In January 2007, he was called up to play for his country in the 2007 South American Youth Championship in Paraguay.  Demonstrating his aerial ability, Larrondo scored two goals against Bolivia in a 4–0 win.  In total Larrondo had three goals in the competition.  He would go on to represent his country in the 2007 FIFA U-20 World Cup in Canada where he played in all the team's games, helping to place Chile third in the tournament.

Honours

Club
Universidad de Chile
Primera División de Chile (1): 2009 Apertura

References

External links

 BDFA profile

1987 births
Living people
Footballers from Santiago
Chilean footballers
Chilean expatriate footballers
Chile under-20 international footballers
Universidad de Chile footballers
C.D. Huachipato footballers
O'Higgins F.C. footballers
Rangers de Talca footballers
AC Arlésien players
Coquimbo Unido footballers
Deportes La Serena footballers
Chilean Primera División players
Segunda División Profesional de Chile players
Ligue 2 players
Primera B de Chile players
Chilean expatriate sportspeople in France
Expatriate footballers in France
Association football defenders